Matchpoint is a British game show that aired on BBC1 from 17 April to 14 June 1990. It is hosted by Angela Rippon.

Format
On each edition, two teams of two contestants compete for a place in the quarterfinals by answering questions. For each correct answer they would score the points as in a tennis match e.g. 15,30,40,Game. Each programme was played by the best of 3 'Sets' and the team who won 2 sets won the show and moved onto the quarterfinals while the losing team went away with a bottle of champagne and a punnet of strawberries.

The prize for the winning team at the end was a trip to that year's Wimbledon event.

References

1990 British television series debuts
1990 British television series endings
BBC television game shows
1990s British game shows
English-language television shows
Television shows shot at BBC Elstree Centre